Anton Mukhovykov (born 20 June 1984) is a professional Ukrainian football midfielder.

Career
Mukhovnykov began his playing career with different youth teams in Dnipropetrovsk. After playing in different Ukrainian clubs, he joined FC Nistru Otaci in Moldovan National Division, where he played during two years. Following that spell he returned to Ukraine.

References

External links 
 
 Profile on Stal club site (Rus)
 

1984 births
Living people
Footballers from Dnipro
Ukrainian footballers
Ukrainian expatriate footballers
Expatriate footballers in Moldova
FC Borysfen-2 Boryspil players
FC Dynamo-3 Kyiv players
FC Dynamo Khmelnytskyi players
FC Stal Alchevsk players
SC Tavriya Simferopol players
FC Hoverla Uzhhorod players
FC Oleksandriya players
FC Tytan Armyansk players
PFC Sumy players
MFC Mykolaiv players
Ukrainian Premier League players
Association football midfielders